Wilhelm Dieter Siebert (born 22 October 1931 in Berlin, died 19 April 2011) was a German composer. During his career he has written mainly for television and films, and also chamber music. He composed an opera Der Untergang der Titanic, which was premiered at the Deutsche Oper Berlin in 1979.

Selected filmography
 The Man in Pyjamas (1981)

References
 Untergang der Titanic
 

1931 births
2011 deaths
German opera composers
Male opera composers
German film score composers
Male film score composers
German male composers
Recipients of the Cross of the Order of Merit of the Federal Republic of Germany
Musicians from Berlin
20th-century German musicians
20th-century German male musicians